Hey Joel is an American adult animated television series that aired on VH1 in 2003. It is about Joel Stein, the host of a three-minute rock-star interview show on VH1 called "3 minutes with Joel". However, he is anything but respectful to his famous guests, often badgering them with aggressive, pointless, irreverent, and often insulting questions.

Jon Cryer provides the voicing for the part of Joel. His coworkers include Michele (Daphne Rubin-Vega), his producer, on whom he has a crush; Kevin (Jacob Tierney), his production assistant; Leif (Josh Alexander), his nemesis, who is VH1's star; and Z (Nancy Giles), the all-business head of programming. The band Fountains of Wayne performs their own original compositions for the show, and appear as animated characters during the musical sequences.

The complete series was made available on DVD on June 24, 2008.

Episodes

 "Judgement Day"
 "Tattoos and Taboos"
 "Dream"
 "Guitar"
 "Dark Week"
 "Big Rack Attack"
 "Business Affairs"
 "Joel Sells Out"
 "Book'd"
 "The Ur-man and the Seal"
 "Hockey"
 "The Niece"
 "Project Televisionary"

References

External links
 
 "How I Nearly Killed VH1" Time magazine article by Joel Stein

2003 American television series debuts
2003 American television series endings
2000s American adult animated television series
2000s American musical comedy television series
2000s American workplace comedy television series
American adult animated comedy television series
American adult animated musical television series
American flash adult animated television series
English-language television shows
VH1 original programming
Television series by Curious Pictures
Television series by Entertainment One